Langwathby is a civil parish in the Eden District, Cumbria, England. It contains 27 listed buildings that are recorded in the National Heritage List for England. Of these, one is listed at Grade I, the highest of the three grades, one is at Grade II*, the middle grade, and the others are at Grade II, the lowest grade.  The parish contains the villages of Langwathby and Edenhall and the surrounding countryside.  In the earlier part of the 20th century the largest building in the parish was Eden Hall, but this was demolished in 1934.  A number of listed buildings are associated with Eden Hall, including The Courtyard, West Lodge, and related structures.  Most of the other listed buildings are houses and associated structures, farmhouses and farm buildings.  The other listed buildings include churches, a medieval roadside cross, a public house, a railway viaduct, a war memorial, and a telephone kiosk.


Key

Buildings

References

Citations

Sources

Lists of listed buildings in Cumbria